Choreotyphis is a genus of sea snails, marine gastropod mollusks in the family Muricidae, the murex snails or rock snails.

Species
Species within the genus Choreotyphis include:
 Choreotyphis erythrostigma (Keen & Campbell, 1964)
 Choreotyphis pavlova (Iredale, 1936)

References

 Houart, R, Buge, B. & Zuccon, D. (2021). A taxonomic update of the Typhinae (Gastropoda: Muricidae) with a review of New Caledonia species and the description of new species from New Caledonia, the South China Sea and Western Australia. Journal of Conchology. 44(2): 103–147.

External links
 Iredale, T. (1936). Australian molluscan notes, no. 2. Records of the Australian Museum. 19(5): 267-340, pls 20-24

Typhinae